Nook is a rural locality in the local government area (LGA) of Kentish in the North-west and west LGA region of Tasmania. The 2016 census recorded a population of 188 for the state suburb of Nook.

History 
Nook was gazetted as a locality in 1965.

Geography
The Don River forms two segments of the western boundary.

Road infrastructure 
Route C150 (Nook Road) runs through from north to south.

References

Towns in Tasmania
Localities of Kentish Council